Unnur is a given name. Notable people with the name include:

Unnur Benediktsdottir Bjarklind (1881–1946), Icelandic poet and prose writer who wrote as Hulda
Unnur Birna Vilhjálmsdóttir (born 1984), former winner of the Miss Iceland pageant
Unnur Brá Konráðsdóttir (born 1974), Icelandic politician
Unnur Steinsson, Miss Iceland 1983

See also
Auður (disambiguation), an Icelandic name of which Unnur was originally a variant form
Unni - Norwegian equivalent as a given name
Hunnur
Unni (disambiguation)

Icelandic feminine given names